The proper handling of war criminals in Canada with regard to criminal prosecution or extradition has been the subject of ongoing debate.

History
Following World War II, Canada held investigations and proceedings against war criminals, lasted until 1948.

During the 1950s, anti-communist political climate turned public opinion away from the atrocities of the World War II and allegedly resulted in an immigration policy which was more permissive to former Nazis.  During this period, approximately 40,000 such individuals could more easily demonstrate a non-communist affiliation and therefore emigrated to Canada from Germany.  Among the influx of Nazis were an unknown number of suspected war criminals.  Ramon Hnatyshyn stated "Canada would not be a haven for those who would commit or who have committed crimes against humanity".  Despite growing awareness and some legislative changes it soon became clear that despite having the required legislation, Canada still lacked the political will to prosecute its most senior war criminals.

During the 1990s, suspected war criminals from more recent conflicts came to Canada.  These included individuals wanted in connection with war crimes in Bosnia, some of the perpetrators of genocide in Rwanda, members of the Colombian secret police and from Sri Lanka.  The treatment of these suspected individuals was seen to shed light on the prevalent attitudes towards suspected World War II war criminals.  Trying these individuals whose lacked support networks within Canada and whose atrocities were still fresh in the public's memory and most importantly were unlikely to die soon of old age became a priority.  They were hunted and either tried or deported.  Information on World War II suspected criminals was suppressed by Canada and the United States.  Some convicted war criminals were allowed to reside while others escaped due process.

Deschênes Commission
In 1985, the Deschênes Commission was created as a Commission of Inquiry on War Criminals in Canada. The Deschênes Commission found that allegations about alleged Nazi war criminals
in Canada had been "grossly exaggerated" by a factor of "over 400%." It recommended a "made in Canada" solution to bringing all war criminals found in this country to justice. Later changes were made to the law of Canada to allow for the prosecution or deportation of suspected war criminals. However, only a small number of cases were pursued.

In 1994 it was announced that Canada would no longer be prosecuting Nazi war criminals.  In 1995, Australian Konrad Kalejs was allowed to leave Canada.  Bernie Farber commented on the rescheduling of Kalejs' deportation hearing: "Granting him this delay without incarcerating him is tantamount to letting him escape." No effort was ever made to identify or bring to justice any individuals in Canada who served in the Soviet-era NKVD, SMERSH or KGB, even when they were publicly identified as such.

Crimes Against Humanity and War Crimes Act
In 2000, the Crimes Against Humanity and War Crimes Act passed as a statute of the Parliament of Canada, which implements Canada's obligations under the Rome Statute of the International Criminal Court.

In the years following the 2000 legislation, the lack of any compelling evidence about Nazi war criminals in Canda may have signalled to other potential war criminals from more recent arenas of conflict that Canada was a safe haven, resulting in at least one KGB veteran attempting to settle here, and likely others. However, in select cases where a suspected war criminal lacked a supporting community, the likelihood of prosecution under the 2000 statute increased.  In 2009, Désiré Munyaneza was found living in Toronto, Ontario, Canada.  He was the first man to be arrested and convicted in Canada on charges of war crimes and crimes against humanity for his role in the 1994 Rwandan genocide.  In 2011, Illandaridevage Kulatunga who was wanted for suspected war crimes in Sri Lanka was able to leave Canada.  Manuel De La Torre Herrera, a former Peruvian police officer who stayed in Canada for two years, was apprehended and deported.

Simon Wiesenthal Centre
The Simon Wiesenthal Centre, an independent organization which has frequently brought suspected Nazi war criminals to trial, has faulted the Government of Canada's efforts to investigate and prosecute Nazi war criminals.  A recent center publication claims that approximately 2,000 Nazi war criminals obtained Canadian citizenship by providing false information. However, other sources have published different estimates. The actual number of surviving war criminals is difficult to determine.  Some allege this is in part due to collusion between Canadian and United States authorities.

See also
László Csizsik-Csatáry

References

Further reading
 Nazi war criminals in Canada: the historical and policy setting from the 1940s to the present : prepared for the Commission of Inquiry on War Criminals. Rodal, Alti 1986.
 Justice delayed: Nazi war criminals in Canada Matas, David; Charendoff, Susan 1987
 Old wounds: Jews, Ukrainians, and the hunt for Nazi war criminals in Canada  Troper, Harold Martin; Weinfeld, Morton 1988
Nazi war criminals in Canada: five years after. Institute for International Affairs. Matas, David (1992).
 Operation Payback: Soviet Disinformation and Alleged Nazi War Criminals in North America, Luciuk, Lubomyr (Kashtan Press, 2021).

World War II crimes
Canadian commissions and inquiries